"The Boy with the Thorn in His Side" is a song by the English rock band the Smiths. It was released as a single in September 1985, reaching No. 23 in the UK Singles Chart. A remixed version appeared on their third album The Queen Is Dead in June 1986.

This was the first single by The Smiths to be accompanied by a promotional music video, something the band had previously resisted. They also performed the song on an episode of Top of the Pops. The main difference between the single version and the album version is in the use of synthesised strings. They are largely absent from the single version, only appearing in the song's coda. In 2003, Morrissey named it his favourite Smiths song.

Background
Margi Clarke asked Morrissey if this song was inspired by Oscar Wilde, and Morrissey replied: "No, that's not true. The thorn is the music industry and all those people who never believed anything I said, tried to get rid of me and wouldn't play the records. So I think we've reached a stage where we feel: if they don't believe me now, will they ever believe me? What more can a poor boy do?"

Track listing

The original 12" and CD singles have "Rubber Ring" and "Asleep" segued into a continuous piece with the voice sample at the end of the former looped and faded into the wind noise preceding the latter. Described by Simon Goddard (in Songs That Saved Your Life, 2nd edition, p. 154) as a "spectacular combination" — a suggestion with which Johnny Marr concurs — this carefully executed sequence could only be found on the original 12" single, before the 2017 release of the remaster/re-issue of The Queen is Dead, which includes the same songs with the same segue as tracks 10 and 11 (respectively) of its "Additional Recordings" bonus disc. The two tracks are separated on all other compilations.

Artwork and matrix message
The jumping man on the sleeve cover of the single release is a young Truman Capote.

The British 7" and 12" version contain the etchings: ARTY BLOODY FARTY/IS THAT CLEVER...JM. "Is that clever" is an allusion to words in "Rubber Ring", a title which itself is a line from The Importance of Being Earnest, a play that was referenced in the etchings of "William, It Was Really Nothing" and Hatful of Hollow. "JM" is a reference to Johnny Marr, and was also an etching on the Sandie Shaw version of "Hand in Glove".

Charts

Reception

Jack Rabid of Allmusic called this single "great ... just another feather in a jeweled cap".

Cover versions

The song was covered by Scottish band Bis on the tribute album The Smiths Is Dead. Reviewer Stephen Thomas Erlewine harshly criticised the cover, writing: "Bis utterly disembowel 'The Boy with the Thorn in His Side' with a single-minded stupidity that is just bewildering."

The song has been covered by Jeff Buckley, to be distributed by Columbia records as a 7" in 2016, after Buckley's death, and by Belle & Sebastian, Scott Matthews, Emilie Autumn, Xiu Xiu, Dinosaur Jr's J Mascis and The Cat Empire in live performances.

In popular culture

 The third episode of the 2004 BBC musical miniseries Blackpool features "The Boy with the Thorn in His Side", sung by David Tennant. 
 The accompanying B-side, "Asleep", which did not appear on The Queen Is Dead, is referenced several times by the main character in Stephen Chbosky's 1999 novel The Perks of Being a Wallflower, and was also featured in the book's film adaptation. 
 "Asleep" appears as one of the tracks on the final mix CD in the 2005 novel As Simple As Snow by Gregory Galloway. 
 In the 2011 film Sucker Punch, Emily Browning's character sings "Asleep".
 Pete Wentz, bassist of Fall Out Boy, named his autobiography The Boy with the Thorn in His Side after the song.

References

1985 songs
1985 singles
The Smiths songs
Songs written by Morrissey
Songs written by Johnny Marr
Rough Trade Records singles
UK Independent Singles Chart number-one singles